The Minks are a four piece American rock band from Nashville, Tennessee led by frontwoman Nikki Barber. Guitar Girl magazine describes the band as “hover[ing] in the space of psyche-blues and pure rock with Barber’s vocals being compared to Patti Smith and Bonnie Raitt.”

The Minks released their first full length album, Light & Sweet, on September 20, 2019 via Café Rooster Records. On March 3, 2023, they self-released their second full length album, Creatures of Culture.

Overview 
Nikki Barber formed The Minks in 2015, after moving to Nashville from Gettysburg, Pennsylvania. Barber recruited longtime friend and former bandmate from the rock-duo Static Trees, Dylan Whitlow (bass), now with DeeOhGee, as well as Ron Gallo (guitar) to form The Minks. 

Prior to moving to Nashville, Nikki earned a Bachelor of Fine Arts in Fashion Design at the Academy of Art University and released her own fashion line called Nikki Stitch. The Minks have performed with artists such JD McPherson, Lilly Hiatt, Aaron Lee Tasjan, Liz Cooper & The Stampede, JEFF the Brotherhood and Okey Dokey.

Discography

Members 
Current Members

 Nikki Barber - Vocals, guitar
 Dylan Sevey – Drums, vocals
 Ben Giesecke - Guitar, vocals
 Henri Young - Bass, vocals

External links 

 Official Site
 Café Rooster Records artist page

References 

Musical groups from Tennessee
American rock music groups